Events in the year 2018 in the Maldives.

Incumbents

President: 
Abdulla Yameen (until 17 November)
Ibrahim Mohamed Solih (from 17 November)
Vice President: Abdulla Jihad

Events

5 February – 2018 Maldives political crisis: president Abdulla Yameen declared a state of emergency and ordered the arrest of two judges of the Supreme Court.
23 September – The 2018 Maldivian presidential election was won by Ibrahim Mohamed Solih.
17 November –  Ibrahim Mohamed Solih took over as the new president of the Maldives, succeeding Abdulla Yameen
19 November - President Solih announced that the Maldives is to rejoin the Commonwealth of Nations, a decision that was recommended by his Cabinet.

Deaths

References

 
2010s in the Maldives
Years of the 21st century in the Maldives
Maldives
Maldives